William James "Jack" Mildenhall (1891–1962) photographed construction of the new Australian capital, Canberra, during its development in the 1920s and 1930s.

Mildenhall was a Commonwealth public servant, initially employed as paymaster in the Department of Works and Railways, he later became the Information Officer for the Federal Capital Commission in 1926.

Mildenhall had seen the need to officially document the growing national capital in photographs, and offered his services to the Department of Works & Railways in 1921; an offer which was readily accepted.

He often took photographs in his own time, and on an ad hoc basis alongside his full-time clerical position, continuing in this role until 1935, when complaints concerning his monopolisation of departmental photography resulted in an inquiry that forced the arrangement to be discontinued.

Mildenhall photographic collection
The Mildenhall photographic collection in the National Library of Australia contains more than 7,700  photographic images on glass negatives of Canberra in the 1920s and 1930s.  The photographs were taken by William James Mildenhall.

Some images from the collection

External links 
 Discovering Mildenhall's Canberra, Museum of Australian Democracy, Canberra
 Mildenhall collection of photographs of Canberra, National Library of Australia, Canberra
 Fact Sheet 222: Mildenhall Photographic Collection, National Archives of Australia, Canberra

1891 births
1962 deaths
Australian photographers
People from Canberra